The 2002 Bedford Borough Council election took place on 2 May 2002 to elect members of Bedford Borough Council in England. This was on the same day as  other local elections.

The whole council was up for election on new ward boundaries and the total number of seats increased by 1 from 53 to 54.

At the election, the Conservatives regained their position as the largest party, coming three seats away from taking majority control of the council.

Summary

Election result

References

Bedford
Bedford Borough Council elections
2000s in Bedfordshire